Bangabandhu Sheikh Mujibur Rahman Maritime University (BSMRMU) was established in 2013, the 37th public university of the country. It is the first maritime university in Bangladesh, the 3rd maritime university in South Asia and the 12th maritime university in the world. It has issued its first calls for admission in December, 2016.

History and overview
Bangabandhu Sheikh Mujibur Rahman Maritime University (BSMRMU), Bangladesh came out as the first ever maritime university of Bangladesh by an Act of the Parliament on 26 October 2013.

List of vice-chancellors 
 Rear Admiral ASM Baten (Retd) 
 Rear Admiral M Khaled Iqbal (Retd) 
 Rear Admiral Mohammad Musa ( present )

Faculties 

The university has 36 departments under a total of 8 faculties for teaching and research at the undergraduate and postgraduate levels in marine fisheries, safe shipping management and administration, naval engineering and technology, oceanography, international maritime law, etc. However, only 5 departments are open for undergraduate level. There is also a Bachelor of Marine Science for Marine Cadets. Apart from this, post-graduate degrees are also being given in some additional subjects. In the future, bachelor's degree will also be given from these faculties. Faculties are as follows: 

1. Faculty of Maritime Governance and Policy (FMGP)	

2. Faculty of Shipping Administration (FSA)	

3. Faculty of Earth and Ocean Science (FEOS)	

4. Faculty of Engineering and Technology (FET)	

5. Faculty of Computer Science and Informatics (FCSI)	

6. Faculty of Maritime Business Studies (FMBS)	

7. Faculty of General Studies (FGS)

Campus
The university has its  temporary campus at Pallabi, Mirpur-12 in Dhaka. But permanent campus will be established at 106.6 acre land at Hamidchar, Bakolia in Chittagong.

Computer labs
Computer Lab facility available for the students of BSMRMU. The Computer Lab situated on the 3rd floor of the campus. The lab computers are connected by both WiFi and broadband internet network .

Conference Centre
Bangabandhu Sheikh Mujibur Rahman Maritime University, Bangladesh has a large auditoriumon on 5th floor in its temporary campus. Seating capacity of the auditorium is 90.

Industrial/study tours and visits
To keep pace with the practical world and to orient the students with maritime domain, BSMRMU organizes the industrial tour, field trip, visit etc. to different domestic and international maritime industries and organizations. The curriculum of master's program of the university has also been designed with mandatory study tour/ field trip to keep the visit effective.
In the national boundary, the students used to visit Chittagong Port Authority, Mongla Port Authority, Bangladesh Shipping Corporation, Bangladesh Navy Ships, Freight Forwarding Companies/ Agencies, Pangaon Inland Container Terminal, Inland Container Depot- Kamalapur, Private Inland Container Depots, Department of Shipping, BIWTA, BIWTC, Private Shipping Companies, Private Stevedoring Companies, Private and Govt. owned Shipyard and Dockyard, Ship Breaking Yard, Sea beach, Oceanographic Research Vessel etc.
In the overseas tour, the students used to visit different maritime institutes, organizations, industries etc. in South Asian and Southeast Asian countries.

Collaboration
List of collaborated Universities/Organizations (Overseas)
World Maritime University
Shanghai Maritime University
Dalian Maritime University
Myanmar Maritime University
Indian Maritime University
Western Sydney University
University of Hawaii at Hilo
Vietnam Maritime University
University of Strathclyde
Dockyard Engineering Works Limited
Institute of Water Modelling

Academics

Undergraduate programs
Faculty of Earth & Oceans Science
 B.Sc. (Hons) in Oceanography
Faculty of Engineering & Technology
 B.Sc. in Naval Architecture and Offshore Engineering
Faculty of Shipping Administration
 BBA in Port Management and Logistics
Faculty of Maritime Governance & Policy
 LLB in Maritime Law

Postgraduate programs
 Master in Oceanography
 MSc in Naval Architecture and Offshore Engineering
 MSc in Coastal and River Engineering
 Master in Marine Biotechnology
 Master in Maritime Science
 MBA in Tourism and Hospitality Management
 Master in Port and Shipping Management
 Master in Maritime Development and Strategic Studies
 LLM in Maritime Law 
 MBA in Maritime Business

Short (Certificate) Courses
 Supply Chain Management
 Freight Forwarding
 Marine Insurance and Claim
 Dangerous Goods Handling and Transportation
 Maritime English
 Project Management

Halls of residence
There are two residential halls on the Dhaka campus of the university to facilitate students to stay. These halls are located in Mirpur DOHS. All sorts of residential facilities are available in these halls.
Hall-1 (Male wing-1)
Hall-2 (Female wing)
Hall-3 (Male wing-2)

References

Further reading
 
 
 
 
 
 
 
 

Universities and colleges in Dhaka
Maritime education
Educational institutions established in 2013
2013 establishments in Bangladesh